is a two episode anime series produced by Nikkatsu Corporation and Rikuentai. It was originally released as an original video animation (OVA) in Japan in 1997 and was licensed for release in North America by U.S. Manga Corps in 1998. It follows the story of a girl named Ayane Mitsui who wishes to become a professional wrestler, but due to a series of events, she becomes a kickboxer instead.

Plot
Ayane Mitsui is a 17-year-old very athletic high school girl who wishes dearly to become a great professional wrestler like her idol Manami Toyota of the All Japan Women's Pro-Wrestling circuit. However, despite many auditions, she cannot qualify. A brilliant kickboxing coach, Kunimitsu, notices potential within the girl and persuades her to train with him. Ayane hates kickboxing and is very vocal about it, but happens to have a greater potential with the sport and sticks with it. Meanwhile, some of the less-savory teachers from her high school have become aware of her extracurricular activities and threaten to expel her if they get proof.

And if that's not enough, another kickboxer, 21-year-old Sakurako Miyagawa, has taken notice of the girl and wants to fight her in the ring to be her enemy next morning when Ayane and Kayoko are still high school.

Media
Ayane's High Kick was produced by Nikkatsu Corporation and Rikuentai, directed by Takahiro Okao, and written by Isao Shizuya. Originally planned to be six parts, only two episodes of the OVA series were released in Japan on January 21 and April 25, 1997. The anime was licensed in North America by U.S. Manga Corps for VHS on April 7, 1998. The series was released on DVD for the first time on October 6, 1998. It received a second DVD release alongside another martial arts anime, Baki the Grappler, on May 28, 2002. Ayane's High Kick aired on AZN Television in August 2007. It also aired several times on AT-X in 2008.

The music for Ayane's High Kick was composed by Nittoku Inoue. The anime features the opening theme "Fight for Yourself" by The Street Beats and the closing theme  sung by Masako Miyamura. A CD soundtrack composed of 25 songs was released by Victor Entertainment in Japan on April 23, 1997. A one-shot manga written and illustrated by Ihara Hiroshi was serialized in Gakken's Monthly Comic Nora from June to December 1997. Hiroshi self-published the collected chapters on August 16, 1998.

Voices

Reception
Martin Ouellette of Protoculture Addicts gave Ayane's High Kick a positive review, calling it "loads of fun, not complicated to follow, cute and completes its mission: entertaining the viewer". He noted that although the plot is cliché for a sports anime, it is executed very well, has "cool" character designs, simple yet dynamic animation, an appropriate soundtrack, and healthy mix of action and comedy. Mania.com's Chris Beveridge similarly noted a light story, copious amount of humor, fairly well defined stereotype characters, and decent artwork for its production period. Jason Bustard of THEM Anime Reviews summarized, "Ayane's High Kick is a fun, charming, double episode pilot that like many others of its era, never managed to take off and become a full series. Fun characters and an interesting premise are marginalized by its short length and obnoxious cliches, but for what it's worth, it's a fun ride."

References

External links
 

1997 anime OVAs
Central Park Media
Comedy anime and manga
Wrestling in anime and manga
Shōnen manga